Dr. Nikhilanand Panigrahy  is a popular Indian Science writer and columnist from Odisha, who popularized science in the Odia language. He has been contributing regularly to a variety of prominent Oriya news papers and magazines since 1973.

Early life and education
Nikhilanand was born on 20 December 1947 in a pious Brahmin family in the village of Dhanantar near Aska in Ganjam district of Odisha in India. He was born to Padmanav Panigrahy and Annapurna Panigrahy. He grew up in a disciplined family environment. He had primary education at village school in Dhanantara. Then he was admitted into Harihara High School, Aska and successfully completed matriculation in 1961. He took up  Bachelor of Science(B.Sc) with Physics Honours in Khallikote College, Berhampur and was awarded the bachelor's degree with distinction and Honours by Utkal University in 1965. Then he completed M.Sc in Physics with specialization in X-rays from the then prestigious Regional Engineering College (REC), now known as National Institute of Technology Rourkela, Rourkela. He earned Ph.D. under the guidance of Prof Prashanta Kumar Mishra. His Ph.D. thesis was about theoretical Solid State Physics. He retired as Director of ''Odisha State Bureau of Text Book Preparation and Production".

Literary Activities
He began his writings in early age. He took an interest in Literature, science and physics from very early on in his life. He derived inspiration from scientists, writers and other eminent personalities. Over 1500 research papers, articles, stories, features written in leading newspapers, magazines, journals of national and international level which include The Samaj, Dharitri, Sambad, Prameya, Anupam Bharat, Bigyan Diganta, Science Horizon, Paurusha, Jhankar, Barttika, Yojana, Utkal Prasanga, Orissa Review and Katha etc.

Publications
Mentioned below:

Story
 Cartoon, Friends Publishers, Cuttack 1973
 Ladhua Mendhara jeevani, Konark Publishers, Cuttack 1989
 Chudamani, Biswa Books, Cuttack 1991
 Lipimayara Prajapati, Cuttack 2012
 Prithvi Baharaku Rasta, Annapurna Publishers, Berhampur 2015
 Janta, Book Emporium, Cuttack 2016
 Rama Lakhmana Sita nathiba Ramayana, Odisha Book Emporium, Cuttack, 2020
 Paraspara, Dakshta Books, Bhubaneswar, 2021

Novel
 Jatha Rabanasya Mandodari, Friends Publishers, Cuttack 1976
 Nahin Nahinra Bandhan, Friends Publishers, Cuttack 1981
 Radha Charit Adha Sata, Friends Publishers, Cuttack 1984
 Purbatan Pilati Jaha Kahe, Annapurna Publishers, Berhampur 2011
 Trikala, Odisha Book Emporium, Cuttack 2014
 Jane Vidhava ra Atma Katha, Sarthak publisher, Berhampur 2017
 Lekhaka ra sesha niswasa, Odisha Book Emporium, Cuttack 2018
 Ek Jatila Prema Kahani, Dakshya Books, Bhubaneswar, 2021

Science
 Aama Pain Bigyana, Sudhanshu Prakashini, Cuttack 1990
 Gyana Bigyana, Friends Publishers, Cuttack 1991
 Atindriya Bigyana, Sudhanshu Prakashini, Cuttack 1997
 Bigyana Jugare Jeevana Jatra, Prachi Sahitya Pratistana, Cuttack 2001
 Adhunika Jugare Bigyana, Prachi Sahitya Pratistana, Cuttack 2002
 Sampratikatara Anuchintare Bigyana o Baigyanika, Text Book Bureau, BBSR, 2007
 Aama Samastanka Pain Bigyana, Annapurna Publishers, Berhampur 2010
 LanjaTara, Annapurna Publisher, Berhampur 2012
 Sarbajanina Bigyana, Odisha Book Emporium, Cuttack 2014
 Pratikhena Bigyana Prajukti Vidya, The Book Point, Bhubaneswar, 2017
 Bigyanara Bahubidha Sparsha, Book Point, Bhubaneswar, 2020

Column & Essays
 Ataphala, Annapurna Publisher, Berhampur 2013
 Sarbanama, Saraswata Sahitya Sanskrutika Parishad, Jaipur 2010
 Priya Mahasaya Namaskara, Lucky Publication, Berhampur 2011
 Singnapura r Khola Ghara, Lucky Publications, Berhampur 2013
 Dhinki Bahanare Biswa Vramana, Lucky Publishers, Berhampur 2015
 Sampratika Itihasa ra Anupama Dhara, Odisha Book Emporium, Cuttack, 2021
 Samaya Srote re Bichalita Nabika, Anapurna Publisher, Berhampur, 2021

Ramya Rachana
 Kumbhakarna, Balighara, Chandikhola Chaka 1998
 Chehra Chori, Lucky Printers, Berhampur 2001
 Ashrama re Basanta Rutu, Lucky Printers, Berhampur 2006
 Matra Lanjatiye Nahi Boli, Annapurna Publishers, Berhampur, 2007
 Jane Napansukar Main Main, Pratichi Prakasana, Berhampur 2008
 Chasama o Prachakhyu, Annapurna Publishers, Berhampur 2008
 Prajapati, Lucky Printers, Berhampur 2009
 Prarthana Hasibaku...Kandibaku Madhya, Asha Pustakalaya, Berhampur 2010

English
 With Eyes From Eye-Bank 1983, Writer's workshop, Kolkata
 Spectrum of a Thinking Mind,2017, Sanbun Publisher, Delhi

Hindi
 Ek Vidhva Ki Atmakatha, 2020, Sathiya Sansthana, Gazhiabad( translated)

Text Books
 +2 Physics-2004(Vol-I), Odisha State Bureau of Text Book Preparation and Production, Bhubaneswar
 +2 Physics-2005(Vol-II), Odisha State Bureau of Text Book Preparation and Production, Bhubaneswar
 Astrology Glossary-2006, Odisha State Bureau of Text Book Preparation and Production, Bhubaneswar

Awards and honors
Sreshtha Galpika, Phalgu Sahitya Sansad, Berhampur, 1988
Rajiva Smaraki Puraskara (Lalita Nibandha, Jhankar), Prajatantra Prachara Samidhi, Cuttack, 2000
Jibana Ranga Puraskara (Prabandha), Cuttack, 2002
Kapileswara Smaraki Saman (Pabandha, Ramya Rachana), Kalinga Sahitya Samaja, Berhampur, 2004
Ganjam Zila Pustaka Mela Samiti (Prose), Berhampur, 2006
Odisha Sahitya Academy (Bayojyesto Prabina Sadhaka, Saraswrata Sambardhan), Bhubaneswar, 2011
Kanta Kabi Puraskaraa, Hasya Vikas Kendra, Cuttack, 2011
Sashi Lekhaka Samana, (Stamvakara, Su Lekhaka), Mahanadi Vihar, Cuttack, 2012
Mahanadi Saraswata Sammana Cuttack (Galpa), 2012
Prabha Patel Baniputra Samana, Utkal Sahitya Samaja (Essay, Ramya Rachana), Cuttack 2012
Bartika Puraskara, Saraswata Sahitya Sanskrutika Parishad, Jajpur, 2013
Chabiraya Smruti Samana (Hasya au Byanga Sahitya) Fakir Mohan Sahitya Parishad, Balasore, 2014
Stambhakara, Biswa Sambad Kendra, Odisha Brahmapur Branch, 2014
Pustaka Mela Sarbocha Saman, Mahanagar Pustaka Mela, Berhampur, 2016
Dr B C Panda Award for environmental and science communication, Odisha Environmental Society, Bhubaneswar, 2019
Rayasaheb Banavihari Mohanty Samman, (Janapriya Bigyana Rachana), Bigyana Prachara Samiti, Cuttack, 2020

References

External links 

1947 births
Living people
Odia-language writers
Writers from Odisha
People from Ganjam district
20th-century Indian essayists
20th-century Indian short story writers
20th-century Indian novelists
Indian popular science writers